Melting Pot is a 1971 studio album recorded by Booker T. & the M.G.'s for Stax Records. It is the last album to feature the group's classic lineup of Jones, Cropper, Dunn, and Jackson and the first of their albums to contain longer, jam-oriented compositions.

Background
By 1970, bandleader/keyboardist Booker T. Jones had become estranged from Stax, as he protested the changing atmosphere under the leadership of executive Al Bell. Jones left Memphis, Tennessee, where Stax was headquartered, and moved to California while guitarist Steve Cropper, also dissatisfied with the new Stax atmosphere, opened his own studio in Memphis, spending less and less time at the Stax studio. Melting Pot was recorded in New York City, between M.G.'s gigs, as Jones refused to record in Memphis and wanted the band to create a different sound for the new album.

The album's title track was edited for length and issued by Stax as a single in spring 1971. "Melting Pot" peaked at number 45 on the Billboard Hot 100 in the United States and at number 21 on the Billboard R&B singles chart.

Critical reception

The review in Rolling Stone magazine was very positive, concluding in its final paragraph: "Altogether, as an album, it works really well, with the group's customary taste and precision balanced against a new looseness and a return to earlier, funky playing patterns. That's more than enough to make it the best Booker T. album in some time, the Memphis Gas of the Year, and a Major Rock Event for everyone."

Village Voice critic Robert Christgau wrote: "Here the Memphis motorvators surpass the somewhat boxy rhythms that have limited all their albums as albums except for Uptight, which had vocals. Al Jackson's solidity, a linchpin of rock drumming as surely as Keith Moon's blastoffs and Charlie Watts's steady economy, is unshaken by the shifts the arrangements demand, and his deftness permits a more flexible concept in which Booker lays back some on organ and Steve Cropper gets more melodic input. A Vegas-jazz ('L.A. Jazz Song' is a title) boop-de-doo chorus upsets the balance of side two pretty badly, but for the first twenty minutes this is unbelievably smooth without ever turning slick."

Track listing
All songs written by Booker T. Jones, Steve Cropper, Donald "Duck" Dunn, and Al Jackson Jr. except "Kinda Easy Like", by Jones, Cropper, Jackson, and Lewis Steinberg.

Side One
"Melting Pot" – 8:15
"Back Home" – 4:40
"Chicken Pox" – 3:26
"Fuquawi" – 3:40

Side Two
"Kinda Easy Like" – 8:43
"Hi Ride" – 2:36
"L.A. Jazz Song" – 4:18
"Sunny Monday" – 4:35

Personnel
Booker T. & the M.G.s
 Booker T. Jones – keyboards
 Steve Cropper – guitar
 Donald Dunn – bass guitar
 Al Jackson Jr. – drums

Additional personnel
 The Pepper Singers – background vocals

Production credits
 Recording engineers – Ron Capone, Gordon Rudd, Rik Pekkonen, Shelly Yakus, Jay Messina, Steve Cropper
 Remix engineer – Steve Cropper
 Cover photographer – George Rodriguez
 Art director – The Graffiteria/Stan Hochstadt
 Art supervisor – Herb Kole, Larry Shaw

Charts

Singles

Samples
"Melting Pot"
"Another Victory" by Big Daddy Kane on his album It's a Big Daddy Thing
"Chicken Pox"
"Silence of the Lambs" by Showbiz and A.G. on their album Runaway Slave

References

External links
 Booker T. & the MGs-Melting Pot at Discogs

Booker T. & the M.G.'s albums
1971 albums
Stax Records albums
Rhythm and blues albums by American artists
Funk albums by American artists
Albums produced by Al Jackson Jr.
Albums produced by Donald "Duck" Dunn
Albums produced by Steve Cropper
Albums produced by Booker T. Jones